Blastobasis kenya is a moth in the family Blastobasidae. It is found in Kenya. The habitat consists of coastal lowlands, eastern midaltitudes and the western highlands.

The length of the forewings is 6–9.2 mm. The forewings are greyish brown intermixed with pale brown and dark brown, or pale brown basally and greyish brown distally. The hindwings are grey.

Food
The larvae feed on a wide range of plants, including: 
 
 Adenia
 Calophyllum inophyllum
 Chrysophyllum viridifolium
 Cola minor
 Deinbollia borbonica
 Diospyros kabuyeana
 Diphasia
 Dovyalis macrocalyx
 Dracaena mannii
 Flacourtia indica
 Hirtella zanzibarica zanzibarica
 Inhambanella henriquezii
 Landolphia
 Lecaniodiscus fraxinifolius scassellatii
 Lepisanthes senegalensis
 Ludia mauritiana
 Manilkara sansibarensis
 Mimusops aedificatoria
 Olea woodiana disjuncta
 Oxyanthus goetzei keniensis
 Rourea minor
 Saba comorensis
 Salacia elegans
 Strychnos madagascariensis
 Terminalia catappa
 Toddalia asiatica
 Trichilia emetica
 Trilepisium madagascariense
 Vepris nobilis
 Ximenia caffra 
 Xylopia

Etymology
The species epithet, kenya, refers to the country of Kenya.

References

Moths described in 2010
Blastobasis
Moths of Africa
Endemic moths of Kenya